Joseph "Joe" Hamilton (born June 9, 1978) is an American goalball player. 

When Hamilton was a baby, he had a corneal transplant in his left eye after contracting rubella virus in the womb which restored his partial sight. He was left totally blind at the age of 12 after a snowboarding accident and two years later, he was introduced to goalball aged 14.

References

External links 
 
  (2016)
  (2000)

1978 births
Living people
Male goalball players
Paralympic goalball players of the United States
Paralympic silver medalists for the United States
Paralympic medalists in goalball
Goalball players at the 2016 Summer Paralympics
Medalists at the 2016 Summer Paralympics
Medalists at the 2015 Parapan American Games
Sportspeople from Michigan
People from Wayne, Michigan